Šipovice (Montenegrin and Bosnian: Шиповице) is a small village in the municipality of Bijelo Polje, Montenegro.

Demographics
According to the 2003 census, the village had a population of 35 people.

According to the 2011 census, its population was 44.

Notable people
Ćamil Sijarić, Yugoslavian writer.

References

Populated places in Bijelo Polje Municipality